Hunter Bradley may refer to:

Hunter Bradley (American football) (born 1994), American football player
Hunter Bradley (Power Rangers Ninja Storm), a fictional character on American television series Power Rangers Ninja Storm